Calligonum junceum is a small shrub native to Central Asia and China, including the Kyzylkum Desert. It has been introduced to the Sahara. It is long fruiting.

References 

junceum
Flora of China